Neengadha Ninaivu is a 1963 Indian Tamil-language film, directed by W. R. Subba Rao. It is a remake of the 1951 Hindi-language film Deedar. The film stars S. S. Rajendran, Kalyan Kumar, C. R. Vijayakumari and Pushpalatha.

Plot 
The story starts with a friendship between two young children. The girl is from an affluent family. She is friends with a poor boy. Both of them used to ride on a horse for fun. The girl's father does not like their friendship. One day he blames the boy that he pushed the girl off the horse. He forbids their meeting thereafter. The children grow up. The boy, now a young man, Kumar, lives in a farmer's house. Another farmer's daughter loves him. Kumar loses his eyesight in an accident. Kumar and the lover girl make their living by singing in the streets. Kumar becomes acquainted with an eye surgeon. The surgeon restores his eyesight. The surgeon becomes friendly with Kumar. Kumar tells the surgeon about his childhood sweetheart. But when Kumar tells the name of his childhood friend, Mala, the surgeon is shocked because he himself is in love with Mala. Kumar learns that Mala has now become the lover of the surgeon. He blinds himself again and returns to singing on the streets.

Cast 
The list is adapted from the review article published in The Hindu.

Male cast
S. S. Rajendran
Kalyan Kumar
V. K. Ramasamy
C. K. Nagesh
S. Ramarao
'Master' Mohan

Female cast
C. R. Vijayakumari
Pushpalatha
T. V. Kumudhini
C. R. Manorama
'Baby' Savithri

Production 
This is a remake of the Hindi film Deedar (1951).

Soundtrack 
Music was composed by K. V. Mahadevan and the lyrics were penned by Vaali, A. Maruthakasi, Kannadasan and Kothamangalam Subbu. The song Netru vandhu Indrirundhu Naalai Pogum is the first Vaali's song sung by T. M. Soundararajan. The song Chinnagnchiru Malarai Maranduvidaathe set to the tune of the Hindi version song "Bachpan Ke Din Bhoolana Dena" composed by Naushad, was a hit.

Reception 
Film historian Randor Guy said the film is "Remembered for the performances of S. S. Rajendran and Kalyankumar.

References

External links 
 

1963 romantic drama films
1963 films
Films about blind people in India
Films scored by K. V. Mahadevan
Indian black-and-white films
Indian romantic drama films
Tamil remakes of Hindi films